DigiPen Institute of Technology is a private, for-profit university in Redmond, Washington. It also has campuses in Singapore and Bilbao, Spain. DigiPen offers bachelor's and master's degree programs in Computer Science, Animation, Video Game Development, Game Design, Sound Design, and Computer Engineering.

DigiPen also offers summer programs for students in grades K-12, online courses and year-long high school programs.

History
In 1988, DigiPen was founded by Claude Comair in Vancouver, British Columbia, Canada as a research and development institute for computer science and animation. Comair continues to be the President and CEO to the present day.

In 1990, DigiPen began offering its first dedicated educational program in the subject of 3D computer animation through the Vancouver Film School.

In 1990, DigiPen began offering a 3D animation program and began collaborating with Nintendo of America to create a post-secondary program for video game programming. With Nintendo's support, DigiPen Applied Computer Graphics School accepted its first class of video game programming students in 1994.

In 1996, the Washington State Higher Education Coordinating Board (HECB) granted DigiPen the authorization to award degree programs in the United States. DigiPen's first offered degree program was the Bachelor of Science in Real-Time Interactive Simulation.

In 1998, DigiPen Institute of Technology opened its campus in Redmond, Washington as a joint campus between DigiPen and Nintendo Software Technology. Redmond became DigiPen's home.

In 2002, DigiPen received national accreditation from the ACCSC. DigiPen began offering its first Masters program, a Masters of Science in Computer Science. DigiPen graduated its last classes in its Associate programs, and only offered Undergraduate and Postgraduate programs.

In 2008, DigiPen Institute of Technology opened its campus in Singapore in conjunction with Singapore's Economic Development Board. Also in 2008, DigiPen's Research & Development arm created an Artificial Intelligence system regarding human behavioral modeling and simulation, titled B-HIVE, for The Boeing Company and their Phantom Works division. B-HIVE and its associated patents were commended as Boeing's "Supplier Technology of the Year" in 2008.

In 2010, DigiPen relocated its main campus to an independent location, still in Redmond, Washington. DigiPen Institute of Technology Singapore joined the public university Singapore Institute of Technology.

In 2011, DigiPen Institute of Technology opened its campus in the Greater Bilbao area, in the municipality of Zierbena.

In 2015, DigiPen's Singapore campus moved to the Singapore Polytechnic campus, while Singapore Institute of Technology’s joint campus began development. DigiPen's Bachelor of Science in Computer Engineering received ABET accreditation.

Campuses

Redmond, Washington, United States
DigiPen's main campus is located in Redmond on 9931 Willows Road.  It offers 9 undergraduate and 2 postgraduate degree programs. It has approximately 1200 full-time students with a faculty-to-student ratio of 1:11 and an average class size of 22.  International students make up 13% of the total student population.  24% of students are women. There are approximately 50 student run organizations on campus. King County is the home to a significant number of technology and game development companies.

Singapore
DigiPen's Singapore campus is DigiPen's first international campus since its establishment in the United States. DigiPen opened its Singapore campus in conjunction with Singapore's Economic Development Board in 2008. Currently, DigiPen operates as an Overseas University Affiliate (Third Party Education Service Provider) for the public university Singapore Institute of Technology. Therefore, DigiPen's Singapore campus arranges courses for the students of Singapore Institute of Technology only, and does not enroll students directly or issue undergraduate certificates independently. DigiPen's Singapore campus offers 5 undergraduate degree programs, including a Bachelor of Engineering with Honours in Systems Engineering (ElectroMechanical Systems) which is not offered in any other campus. Moreover, this campus regularly offers Specialist Diploma Programs (unaccredited) jointly with Workforce Singapore. DigiPen's Singapore campus has approximately 900 full-time students from Singapore Institute of Technology.

Bilbao, Spain
DigiPen's Europe campus is located in Ribera de Zorrotzaurre, 2 in the city of Bilbao. It offers 2 undergraduate degree programs, with approximately 200 full-time students.

International university partnerships
 Keimyung University in Daegu, South Korea and DigiPen Institute of Technology have a collaboration where students local to South Korea have the option to spend a program's first 5 semesters in Daegu, taught by DigiPen Faculty members, and the remaining semesters in Redmond.
 Thammasat University in Bangkok, Thailand and DigiPen Institute of Technology have a collaboration where students local to Thailand have the option to spend a program's first 2-4 semesters in Bangkok and the remaining semesters in Redmond.

Academics

Primary educational paths
 CS - Standard computer science education with emphasis on high performance programming.
 RTIS – Real Time Interactive Simulation (core game engine architecture and programming)
 GD – Game Design (gameplay architecture, programming and scripting)
 FA – Fine Arts (digital art and animation).
 E – Engineering (computer hardware, and software architecture)
 MSD – Music and Sound Design
 DA – Digital Audio

Accreditation
DigiPen is accredited by the Accrediting Commission of Career Schools and Colleges.  DigiPen's Bachelor of Science in Computer Science in Real-Time Interactive Simulation and Bachelor of Science in Computer Engineering are accredited by the Accreditation Board for Engineering and Technology.

Research and development
DigiPen Research & Development performs research for The Boeing Company and has received the commendations of Boeing Supplier of the Year Award in Technology in 2008 and Boeing Performance Excellence Award in 2008, 2013, and 2014.  DigiPen has a professional relationship with Phantom Works and BR&T.

DigiPen Research & Development is active in the research in Formula 1 and INDYCAR, and is technical sponsor of Renault F1 (2008–present) and Andretti Autosport (2015–present).

Criticism 

 DigiPen has been criticized for asserting ownership over the copyright of work performed by their students.
In a 2021 video entitled "DigiPen: The College That Teaches Crunch Culture", gaming journalist and YouTuber Jim Sterling, citing a series of anonymous interviews they had conducted with former DigiPen students, accused the school of conditioning students into the crunch culture of the larger video game industry and criticized practices such as overburdening students with impossible workloads and class requirements, failure to communicate grades and academic standing with students, and hiring and maintaining professors with outdated industry experience who reportedly engaged in yelling, intimidation, and other abusive behavior towards students. According to Sterling, DigiPen was reached out to for comment a week before the video's release and did not respond.

Rankings

 In 2015, Business Insider published a list of the 50 best computer science and engineering schools in USA in which DigiPen was ranked 50th. In that same year, the Princeton Review ranked DigiPen No. 3 on its annual list of "Top 25 Undergraduate Schools to Study Game Design," as well as No. 5 on its list of "Top 25 Graduate Schools to Study Game Design".
In 2019, Animation Career Review ranked DigiPen as the sixth best Video Game University in the United States. In that same year, Princeton Review ranked DigiPen No.4 on its annual list of "Top 50 Undergraduate Schools to Study Game Design", as well as No. 6 on its list of "Top 25 Graduate Schools to Study Game Design".
DigiPen consistently ranked as a top US undergraduate school to study Game Design in Princeton Review and Animation Career Review since 2010 and 2015 respectively. However, excluding The Business Insider in 2015, no other ranking (such as Times Higher Education World University Rankings 2019 for computer science) in the later years ranked DigiPen as a Computer Science and Engineering School.

Notable faculty
 Ellen Beeman - fantasy and science fiction author, television screenwriter, and computer game designer/producer Beeman is a Senior Lecturer of Game Software Design and Production at DigiPen.
 Mike Pondsmith -  roleplaying, board, and video game designer

Notable alumni
 Nate Martin - "Founding Father of Escape Rooms", Co-founder & CEO of Puzzle Break
 Kim Swift - designer on the Portal team
 Aubrey Edwards - video game developer and professional wrestling referee
 Jon Everist - video game composer and audio designer for BattleTech, Necropolis, and Shadowrun: Hong Kong

References

External links
 Official website

Engineering universities and colleges in Washington (state)
Private universities and colleges in Washington (state)
Video game universities
Educational institutions established in 1988
For-profit universities and colleges in the United States
Universities and colleges in King County, Washington
Education in Redmond, Washington
1988 establishments in Washington (state)